Paul Stapfer (1840–1917) was a French essayist, born in Paris, and educated at the Bonaparte Lyceum.  After serving as tutor in the family of François Guizot, he became a professor at Grenoble.  In 1883, he accepted a similar professorship at Bordeaux. Stapfer's essays are remarkable for their clarity of style, perfection of finish and accuracy of detail.  He edited the Grands écrivains series. Among his works are:  
 Petite comédie de la critique littéraire de Molière selon les trois écoles philosophiques (1866)
 Causeries guernesiaises (1881)  
 Laurence Sterne, sa personne et ses ouvrages (second edition, Paris, 1882)
 Shakespeare et l'antiquité (1883), which revealed to anti-Stratfordians the depth of its subject's knowledge of Latin and his formidable acquaintance with Greek.
 Goethe et ses deux chefs-d'œuvre classiques (1881)
 Racine et Victor Hugo (1886)
 Rabelais, sa personne, son génie, son œuvre (1889)
 Montaigne (1894)
 La grande prédication chrétienne en France: Bossuet, Adolphe Monod (1898)
 Des réputations littéraires and Victor Hugo et la grande poésie satirique en France (1901)
 Questions esthétiques et religieuses (1906)  
 Vers la vérité'' (1909)

External links
 

French essayists
French biographers
1840 births
1917 deaths
Academic staff of Grenoble Alpes University
Academic staff of the University of Bordeaux
French male essayists
Male biographers